The Rembau railway station is a Malaysian train station on the West Coast Line, located at and named after the town of Rembau, Negeri Sembilan.

The station was upgraded under the Seremban–Gemas Electrified Double Tracking Project.

The station is served by the KTM Komuter Seremban Line. Previously, it was served by KTM Intercity and ETS trains. It was for a short while, the southern terminus of the Rawang–Seremban line for selected peak hour trains with three departures during morning peak, and three arrivals during evening peak daily, with most trains terminating at Sungai Gadut instead the arrangement ended when Komuter services were extended to Pulau Sebang/Tampin in 2015 as part of a shuttle service from Seremban. The shuttle ended in 2016 with most trains either terminating at Sungai Gadut or Tampin. It was also at this time where ETS services were withdrawn.

References

Seremban Line